"Songbird" is a song by Kenny G, played on a soprano saxophone, and the third single from his 1986 album Duotones. It reached No. 3 on the Billboard Adult Contemporary chart, No. 4 on the Hot 100 chart and No. 23 on the R&B chart.

When released in 1987, the song became the first instrumental to reach the top 5 of the Billboard Hot 100 since the "Miami Vice Theme" by Jan Hammer (a No. 1 hit) in 1985.

Charts

Certifications

References

1986 songs
1987 singles
1980s instrumentals
Kenny G songs
Pop instrumentals
Arista Records singles